The 1978–79 Cypriot Third Division was the eighth season of the Cypriot third-level football league. Orfeas Nicosia won their 1st title.

Format
Ten teams participated in the 1978–79 Cypriot Third Division. All teams played against each other twice, once at their home and once away. The team with the most points at the end of the season crowned champions. The first team was promoted to 1979–80 Cypriot Second Division. The last team was relegated to regional leagues.

Point system
Teams received two points for a win, one point for a draw and zero points for a loss.

League standings

Sources

See also
 Cypriot Third Division
 1978–79 Cypriot First Division
 1978–79 Cypriot Cup

Cypriot Third Division seasons
Cyprus
1978–79 in Cypriot football